Louis Chedid (born 1 January 1948, in Ismaïlia) is a French singer-songwriter of Lebanese and Egyptian origin.

Biography
Louis Chedid is the son of the writer Andrée Chedid and the father of Matthieu Chedid (better known as -M-).

As a child he made his first footsteps into the singing world as a member of the "Manécanterie des Petits Chanteurs à la Croix de Bois", a famous French catholic boys choir.

Chedid was a fan of the jazz guitarist Django Reinhardt and decided that he would set forth into a career in the world of music as soon as he left school. After his first album "Balbutiements" (Mumblings – 1973) attracted little attention, his talent was first recognised after the release of titles like "La Belle" and "T'as beau pas être beau" released in 1977.

In 1981, "Ainsi soit-il" (Amen) rose to the top of the charts, followed four years later by "Anne ma sœur Anne" (My sister Anne) which criticised the increasing popularity of the extreme-right in France. His first, autobiographical novel – 40 Berges Blues – was published in 1992.

Chedid is also the composer of Pierre-Dominique Burgaud's "Le Soldat Rose" (The Pink Soldier, 2006), a fairytale musical whose songs have been interpreted by singers including -M-, Vanessa Paradis, Jeanne Cherhal, Francis Cabrel, Alain Souchon and Bénabar.

Discography

Albums

Promotional singles
 "Miss Melissa" (1974)
 "Je chante sous les transistors" (1977)
 "La Belle" / "Chapeau de paille" (1977)
 "T'as beau pas être beau" / "L'Amour S.M.P.M" (1978)
 "Papillon" / "Dans la rue de Sherbrooke" (1979)

Collaborations
 Fairytale-Musical "Émilie Jolie" (Philippe Chatel, 1979) : chanson du raton-laveur-rêveur (Song of the dreaming racoon)
 Duo with his son Matthieu Chedid : Tel père tel fils (like father like son) – for Solidays, a French AIDS charity appeal

References

External links
 

1948 births
Living people
People from Ismailia Governorate
French singer-songwriters
Egyptian emigrants to France
French people of Lebanese descent
French male singers
French guitarists
French male guitarists
Commandeurs of the Ordre des Arts et des Lettres
French male singer-songwriters